Nestor Nyzhankivsky (Nestor Ostapovych Nyzhankivsky); August 31, 1893–April 10, 1940) was a Ukrainian composer, pianist and music critic. Received his doctoral degree in history from Vienna University and graduated from the Prague State Conservatory.

Live 
Nestor Nyzhankivsky was born August 31, 1893 in Berezhany in the family of the composer, conductor, a Greek Catholic priest Ostap Nyzhankivsky. Nyzhankivsky family moved to Stryi in 1900, where Nestor finished school and gymnasium. Then he studied at the Higher Music Institute Mykola Lysenko Lviv.

During the First World of War Nyzhankivsky was drafted into the army, then taken prisoner, where he returned in 1918.
He received a PhD in history from Vienna University (1923) and graduated from the Prague State Conservatory (1927) in the master class of Vítězslav Novák.

He returned to Galicia to teach piano and theory at the Lysenko Higher Institute of Music in Lviv (1931–39) and became one of the founders (and first chairman) of the Union of Ukrainian Professional Musicians (SUPROM).

He died in exile April 10, 1940 in Lodz. The remains of Nestor Nyzhankivsky were reburied in cemetery of the city Stryi November 1993, near the tomb of his parents.

Composer and musical activities 
Nestor Nyzhankivsky composer left a great artistic heritage. His compositions for fortepiano include: "Prelude and Fugue on a Ukrainian Theme in C Minor", "Piano Trio in E Minor", "Little Suite", "Intermezzo in D Minor", and the "Great Variations" (also known as "Variations on a Ukrainian Theme in F Sharp Minor".) Art songs for voice and piano: "Ty liubchyku za horoliu" (My Beloved beyond the Mountain, text by U. Kravchenko), "Zasumui trembito" (Trembita's Dirge, text by R. Kupchynsky), "Naimyt" (The Hireling, text by I. Franko) and so on.

References

External links 

 Nestor Nyzhankivsky
 Nyzhankivsky, Nestor - Encyclopedia of Ukraine

1893 births
1940 deaths
Ukrainian composers